The following article presents a summary of the 1915 football (soccer) season in Brazil, which was the 14th season of competitive football in the country.

Campeonato Paulista

In 1915 there were two different editions of the Campeonato Paulista. One was organized by the Associação Paulista de Esportes Atléticos (APEA) while the other one was organized by the Liga Paulista de Foot-Ball (LPF).

APEA's Campeonato Paulista

Final Standings

AA das Palmeiras declared as the APEA's Campeonato Paulista champions.

LPF's Campeonato Paulista

Final Standings

Germânia declared as the LPF's Campeonato Paulista champions.

State championship champions

Brazil national team
The Brazil national football team did not play any matches in 1915.

References

 Brazilian competitions at RSSSF
 1914-1922 Brazil national team matches at RSSSF

 
Seasons in Brazilian football
Brazil